The Case of the Screaming Bishop is a 1944 American animated short film in the Phantasies series of animated cartoons produced by the Screen Gems studio for Columbia Pictures from 1939 to 1946. The film was directed by Howard Swift.
The title is a parody of the ninth Perry Mason mystery novel The Case of the Stuttering Bishop.

Plot
A dinosaur skeleton is stolen from the "Museum of Unnatural History" so Hairlock Combs (a parody of Sherlock Holmes) and his assistant Dr. Gotsum disguise themselves as a horse and visit the scene of the crime. It is ultimately revealed that the thief is a concert xylophonist who is obsessed with using the skeleton as his instrument. Throughout the film, he repeats the phrase, "The best bones of all go to Symphony Hall!"

Cast
John McLeish as Hairlock Combs, Dr. Gotsum, "X", Museum Guard, Policeman (voice, uncredited)

References

External links

1944 short films
1940s animated short films
Comedy mystery films
American animated short films
1940s American animated films
1944 animated films
Columbia Pictures short films
Screen Gems short films
Columbia Pictures animated short films
American black-and-white films
Films scored by Eddie Kilfeather
1940s English-language films